Beetley is a village and civil parish in the Breckland district of Norfolk, England.  According to the 2011 census the parish had a population of 1,396. The village is situated four miles (6 km) north of East Dereham.

History 
Beetley was then part of the parish of Bittering Magna, however the Parish divided into Beetley and Gressenhall. Beetley was then combined with the neighbouring parish of East Bilney in 1935. Between 1870 and 1872, an excerpt was written about the town BEETLEY, a parish in Mitford district, Norfolk; 2 miles WSW of Elmham r. station, and 4 N by W of East Dereham. Post Town, Elmham, under Thetford. Acres, 1,770. Real property, £2,870. Pop., 363. Houses, 82. The property is divided among a few. The living is a rectory, annexed to the rectory of East Bilney, in the diocese of Norwich. The church is good.

Government 
The Parish Council of Beetley consists of 7 Councillors, who meet on the first Thursday of every month, except January and August in the village hall. The public are allowed to attend these meetings, and can provide their input certain moments during the meeting, with the local County and District Councillor attending the meetings.

The village is in Lincoln ward of the Breckland district of Norfolk, where the two District Councillors are Richard Duffield (Conservative) and Robert Richmond (Conservative). The former has held the position since 2011 and the latter, since 1999. Beetley is part of the Necton and Launditch Ward at County level, with the Ward Councillor being Mark Kiddle Morris (Conservative) who has held the role since 2009.

Necton and Launditch is a part of the Mid Norfolk parliamentary constituency. The MP who represents Mid Norfolk is George Freeman (Conservative), who has held the position since 2010. The constituency has been a strong Conservative area since it was re-established in 1983, with the lowest percentage of votes for the Conservative Party being at 39.6% in 1997, to the highest being 56.69% in 1987.

Geography and geology

Geography 
Beetley is:
 27.35 km (17 miles) north west of Norwich
 80 km (50 miles) north east of Peterborough
 153 km (95 miles) north east of London

Geology 
According to the BGS, Beetley has a superficial deposit of glacial sand and gravel, whilst the bedrock of Beetley and the surrounding area consists of sandstone and mudstone, with veins of white chalk running across Beetley.

Climate 
Beetley experiences an Oceanic climate.

Demography 
Since 1801, the population of Beetley has indicated a positive correlation up to the 2011 census, as the population in 1801 was 242 whilst the recent 2011 census shows that the population is 1,396. The breakdown of the population includes 672 males and 724 females in Beetley, with 17.6% being under 18, 46.5% being between the ages of 18 and 60 and 35.9% of the population above the age of 60.

Out of the population aged 16 or over, 93.9% of the population were born in England, 0.9% were born in Northern Ireland, 1.6% were born in Scotland, 0.9% were born in Wales, 1.3% were born in EU member nations or accession countries and 1.4% were born in nations outside of the EU.

In terms of religious beliefs, 64.5% are Christians, 0.3% are Buddhist, 0.2% are Jewish, 0.4% follow an alternative religion, 8.4% did not state their religious affiliation and 26.3% do not follow a religion

Out of the population over 16, 22.5% have no qualifications, whilst 77.5% have a qualification or in an apprenticeship, matching the national statistics

Economy 
In 1831, the main form of employment in Beetley was through agriculture (78.5%) and handicrafts and retail (19.4%),

According to the 2011 census, 65.8% of the population are economically active, whilst 34.2% are not. In contrast, nationally, 69.9% are economically active and 30.1%.

The largest notable groups of the active population are the 13.3% that are in part-time employment, 34% that are in full-time employment, 14.8% that are self-employed, 1.9% that are full-time students whilst 24.6% are retired, 4.3% are full-time home-makers and 1.4% are full-time carers. The statistics are similar compared to the national statistics aside from percentage of those retired which nationally sits at 13.7%.

Out of the 640 economically active people in Beetley, the main sectors that people are employed are as Managers, Directors and Senior Officials (13.1%), in Professional Occupations (15.3%), are Associate Professionals and Technical Occupations (11.7%), Administrative and Secretarial Occupations (10.5%), Skilled Trades Occupations (18%) and Caring, Leisure and Other Service Occupations (11.1%). These key statistics are similar to the national statistics, aside from Skilled Trades Occupation which nationally equates for 11.4%

Landmarks and notable buildings

Beetley Village Hall 
Beetley Village Hall was built in the 1960s and is in the centre of the Parish, surrounded by a 9-acre playing field, which hosts football and cricket matches for the local teams, alongside carpet bowls and table tennis events. The site is protected by Fields in Trust through a legal "Deed of Dedication" safeguarding the future of the space as public recreation land for future generations to enjoy. The hall itself contains a large function room, smaller meeting room and kitchen facilities and is regularly used by groups, clubs, events and meetings between councillors.

St Mary-Magdalen's Church 
The Church is believed to be built on the site mentioned in the Doomsday Book (1087) and is dated to 1320. The tower of the church was heightened in the 16th Century, with the north isle being demolished in the 18th century and with windows being installed in the wall.

Education

Infant and junior
 St Mary's Community Primary School

Local media 
Beetley Parish Council publish a newsletter, called "The Beetley Buzz". The newsletter is delivered free to all households and provides information about local events.

Sport 
 Beetley Football Club play in the Crown Fire Central & South Norfolk League at the Village Hall Playing Field.
 Beetley Cricket Club play in the third division of the West Norfolk Cricket League.

War Memorial
Beetley's war memorial takes the form of two marble plaques inside St. Mary Magdalene's Church. It list the following names for the First World War:
 Lance-Corporal Ernest G. Buck (1891-1916), 2nd Battalion, Essex Regiment
 Lance-Corporal C. Arthur Buck (1894-1916), 8th Battalion, Royal Norfolk Regiment
 Gunner Leonard Massingham (d.1918), 440th Siege Battery, Royal Garrison Artillery
 Gunner Walter Rawson (d.1917), 88th Brigade, Royal Field Artillery
 Private Alfred E. Hubbard (d.1916), 7th Battalion, Royal Fusiliers
 Private Cyril A. Holmes (1896-1918), 1st Battalion, Grenadier Guards
 Private Walter J. Buck (1896-1917), 5th Battalion, Royal Norfolk Regiment
 Private Harry J. Hood (1899-1916), 8th Battalion, Royal Norfolk Regiment
 Sapper Frederick J. Burton (1875-1918), 35th Army Troops Company, Royal Engineers

And, the following for the Second World War:
 Corporal John F. Hill (1917-1944), 5th Battalion, Royal Norfolk Regiment
 Private Ronald W. Patterson (1921-1943), 5th Battalion, Royal Norfolk Regiment

References

External links

Villages in Norfolk
Civil parishes in Norfolk
Breckland District